Climate change is impacting the environment and human population of the United Kingdom (UK). The country's climate is becoming warmer, with drier summers and wetter winters. The frequency and intensity of storms, floods, droughts and heatwaves is increasing, and sea level rise is impacting coastal areas. The UK is also a contributor to climate change, having emitted more greenhouse gas per person than the world average. Climate change is having economic impacts on the UK and presents risks to human health and ecosystems. 

The government has committed to reducing emissions by 50% of 1990 levels by 2025 and to net zero by 2050. In 2020, the UK set a target of 68% reduction in emissions by 2030 in its commitments in the Paris Agreement. The country will phase-out coal by 2024. Parliament passed Acts related to climate change in 2006 and 2008, the latter representing the first time a government legally mandated a reduction in greenhouse gas emissions. The UK Climate Change Programme was established in 2000 and the Climate Change Committee provides policy advice towards mitigation targets. In 2019, Parliament declared a 'climate change emergency'. The UK has been prominent in international cooperation on climate change, including through UN conferences and during its European Union membership.   

Climate change has been discussed by British politicians since the late 20th century, but it has attracted greater political, public and media attention in the UK from the 2000s. Public opinion polls show concern amongst the majority of Britons. The British royal family have also prioritised the issue and various climate change activism initiatives have taken place in the UK.

Greenhouse gas emissions

Impacts on the natural environment

Temperature and weather changes 

The Central England temperature series, recorded since 1659 in the Midlands, shows an observed increase in temperature, consistent with anthropogenic climate change rather than natural climate variability and change. According to the Met Office, climate change will affect the climate of the United Kingdom with warmer and wetter winters and hotter and drier summers. Spanish plumes will continue but bring more intense weather conditions such as hotter summer weather and summer thunderstorms.

By 2014, the United Kingdom's seven warmest and 4 out of its 5 wettest years had occurred between the years of 2000–2014. Higher temperatures increase evaporation and consequently rainfall. In 2014, England recorded its wettest winter in over 250 years with widespread flooding.

In parts of the south east of the UK, the temperature in the hottest days of the year increased by 1 °C per decade in the years 1960 - 2019. The highest ever recorded temperature in the United Kingdom was recorded in 2022 in Coningsby at 40.3 °C. In 2020, the chances of reaching a temperature above 40 °C were low, but they are 10 times higher than in a climate without human impact. In modest emissions scenario, by the end of the century, it will happen every 15 years and in high emissions scenario every 3 – 4 years. Summers with temperatures above 35 °C occur in the UK every 5 years, but will occur almost every other year in the high emission scenario by 2100.

Extreme weather events 
The Met Office outlines that more frequent and intense extreme weather events will affect the UK due to climate change.

Floods
Due to increased rainfall from warmer and wetter winters, increased flooding is expected. An interactive map from the UK government shows areas at risk of flooding.

Heat waves 

Heat waves are becoming more intense and more likely in the UK due to climate change. Of the UK's top ten hottest days on record, nine have been recorded between 1990 and 2022. The 2022 heatwave resulted in the first code red extreme heat warning in the country, instigating a declaration of national emergency, and causing wildfires and widespread infrastructure damage.

Sea level rise 
The rate of rise more than doubled between the early 20th and early 21st century to a rate of 3-5.2 millimetres per year. By 2050, it is predicted that around a third of England's coast will be impacted, leading to almost 200,000 homes needing to be abandoned. The most affected regions will be the South West, North West and East Anglia.

Water and drought 
Droughts in the United Kingdom are expected to become more severe. Water quality in rivers and lakes may decline due to higher temperatures, reduced river flows and increased algal blooms in summer, and increased river flows in winter.

Impacts on ecosystems 
Warming temperatures are impacting wildlife and plant life. Some species' ranges are shifting north, and Scottish alpine plants have declined. With spring coming earlier each year, many plant and animal species are unable to adapt quickly enough. Birds are impacted by climate change, with warm weather species like cattle egrets and purple herons observed breeding in the UK for the first time in the 2010s, while cold-adapted birds like lapwings have declined. More regular droughts also have cumulative implications for many British species and ecosystems. For example, in 2022, Ouse Washes wetlands was at risk of drying out.

Climate change will also impact marine life around the British Isles, including some commercially valuable fish species. The distributions of many fish species are expected to shift, with cold adapted species declining and warm adapted species becoming established.

Impacts on people

Economic impacts 
According to the Government, the number of households in flood risk will be up to 970,000 homes in the 2020s, up from around 370,000 in January 2012. The effects of flooding and managing flood risk cost the country about £2.2bn a year, compared with the less than £1bn spent on flood protection and management. UK agriculture is also being impacted by drought and weather changes.

In 2020 PricewaterhouseCoopers estimate that Storm Dennis damage to homes, businesses and cars could be between £175m and £225m and Storm Ciara cost up to £200m. Friends of the Earth criticised British government of the intended cuts to flood defence spending. The protection against increasing flood risk as a result of climate change requires rising investment. In 2009, the Environment Agency calculated that the UK needs to be spending £20m more compared to 2010 to 2011 as the baseline, each and every year out to 2035, just to keep pace with climate change.

The British government and the economist Nicholas Stern published the Stern Review on the Economics of Climate Change in 2006. The report states that climate change is the greatest and widest-ranging market failure ever seen, presenting a unique challenge for economics. The Review provides prescriptions including environmental taxes to minimise economic and social disruptions. The Stern Review's main conclusion is that the benefits of strong, early action on climate change far outweigh the costs of not acting. The Review points to the potential impact of climate change on water resources, food production, health, and the environment. According to the Review, without action, the overall costs of climate change will be equivalent to losing at least 5% of global gross domestic product (GDP) each year, now and forever. Including a wider range of risks and impacts could increase this to 20% of GDP or more. The review leads to a simple conclusion: the benefits of strong, early action considerably outweigh the costs.

Health impacts 

Climate change has significant implications for health, healthcare and health inequality in the UK. The National Health Service describes climate change as a "health emergency", citing the health impacts of floods, storms and heat waves, as well as the increased risk of infectious diseases such as tick-borne encephalitis and vibriosis. It also suggests reduction of greenhouse gas emissions would also reduce deaths from air pollution.

Climate change had made heat waves 30 times more likely in the UK and 3,400 people died from them in the years 2016–2019. Climate change-driven heatwaves in other countries important for crop production may also be more severe, which will have an indirect impact on the UK. UK heat waves have implications for human health and can drive excess deaths, particularly among the elderly.

Mitigation and adaptation

Mitigation 

In 2019, Prime Minister Theresa May announced the UK would strive to reach carbon neutrality by 2050, making the country the first major economy to do so. Prime Minister Boris Johnson announced in 2020 that UK will set a target of 68% reduction in greenhouse gas emissions by the year 2030 and include this target in its commitments in the Paris Agreement.

Calculations in 2021 indicated that, for giving the world a 50% chance of avoiding a temperature rise of 2 degrees or more, the United Kingdom should increase its climate commitments by 17%. For a 95% chance, it should increase the commitments by 58%. For giving a 50% chance of staying below 1.5 degrees, the United Kingdom should increase its commitments by 97%.

Energy 

Although not motivated by environmental concerns, under Margaret Thatcher, the UK's coal industry was reduced, with subsidies cut and the coal miner's union weakened following a miners' strike. In 2015, the government announced that all remaining coal-fired power stations would be closed by 2025. In 2021, it brought forward its coal phase-out target to 2024.

Electric vehicles

Policies and legislation 

The Climate Change Programme was launched in November 2000 by the British government in response to its commitment agreed at the 1992 United Nations Conference on Environment and Development.

There is in place national legislation, international agreements and the EU directives. The EU directive 2001/77/EC promotes renewable energy in the electricity production.

The Climate Change and Sustainable Energy Act 2006 is an Act of the Parliament of the United Kingdom which aims to boost the number of heat and electricity micro-generation installations in the United Kingdom, so helping to cut carbon emissions and reduce fuel poverty.

The Climate Change Act 2008 makes it the duty of the Secretary of State to ensure that the net UK carbon account for all six Kyoto greenhouse gases for the year 2050 is at least 80% lower than the 1990 baseline. It also created the independent Climate Change Committee to advise the government on policies to reach its goals. The Act made the UK the first country to legally mandate reductions in greenhouse gas emissions.

In May 2019, Parliament approved a motion declaring a national climate change emergency. This does not legally compel the government to act, however.

The Climate and Ecological Emergency Bill was tabled as an early day motion on 2 September 2020 and received its first reading the same day. 

The Health and Care Act 2022 includes a target of carbon neutrality for the National Health Service by 2040, and an 80% reduction in emissions by 2028 to 2032.

Adaptation 

The UK's National Adaptation Programme seeks to create a "climate-ready society" and expects individual households to adapt to climate change. A systematic review in Climatic Change concluded many households in the UK struggled to achieve long-term adaptive capacity. Increased flood risk also has implications for the UK's fully privatised insurance sector and relevant governance of it. The Bank of England has outlined a policy of maintaining financial stability amid climate change impacts on the UK.

The town of Happisburgh, where homes are being affected by coastal erosion and sea level rise, is the location of a "Pathfinder" project where owners of homes about to fall into the sea were offered market prices to relocate inland.

The Wildlife Trusts have suggested reintroduction of Eurasian beavers improves resilience of British rivers and wetlands to droughts, create carbon sinks and prevent flooding.

International cooperation 
Since the premiership of Tony Blair, climate change has been a high priority issue in the UK's foreign policy. The UK has raised the issue at meetings of international bodies of which it is a member, including the G8 and United Nations Security Council. The UK was also influential on the climate change policy of the European Union during its membership.

British diplomats have been involved in the negotiation of international agreements in United Nations summits. Ahead of the 2009 conference while talks had been stalling, prime minister Gordon Brown launched a manifesto calling for an international agreement that would bring investment into climate change adaptation in developing countries. The UK hosted the 2021 UN Climate Change Conference in Glasgow, during which the Glasgow Climate Pact was negotiated and agreed. In the lead-up to the conference, Richard Moore said the Secret Intelligence Service had begun monitoring the activities of major polluters to ensure they adhere to their commitments on mitigation and the Foreign, Commonwealth and Development Office said it would put £290m towards climate change initiatives in developing countries.

Society and culture

Public opinion 
By 2021, YouGov recorded that 72% of Britons believe that climate change is caused by human activity, which had increased from 49% in 2013. According to the Office for National Statistics, as of October 2021, 75% of British adults said that they either very or somewhat worried about climate change, whilst 19% were neither worried or unworried. British women were more likely than men to be worried about the impact of climate change, as were younger compared to older age groups.

Politics 
In 1989, Margaret Thatcher made two speeches that are considered among the earliest statements by a world leader on climate change.

Climate change has been discussed by members of the Parliament of the United Kingdom; in 2019, Carbon Brief analysed mention of climate change in the UK parliamentary record from Hansard. It found that mention of the "greenhouse effect" and "global warming" had appeared in British parliamentary records since the 1980s, with the term "climate change" used more since the late 1990s. The first mention was by Jestyn Philipps in 1969. It concluded that Labour MPs were the most vocal party on the issue, mentioning climate change 8,463 times, compared to 5,860 by Conservative MPs and 2,426 by Liberal Democrat MPs.

Before 2005 and 2006, climate change received little political attention in the UK. However, between 2006 and 2010, campaigns by environmental non-governmental organization generated attention towards climate change in British media, and it became a bipartisan issue in UK politics. The Climate Change Act 2008 passed with the support of 463 MPs from several political parties, and only 5 against. Under David Cameron, the Conservative Party adopted environmental policies as a means to connect with younger voters, with Cameron's support of the Big Ask campaign being a critical turning point. The Conservative–Liberal Democrat coalition maintained political momentum on climate policy, but criticism from the political right later weakened Cameron's international leadership on the issue. The Conservatives prioritised the issue during the premiership of Boris Johnson. 

Despite shifts in public and political opinion in the 21st century, climate change denial exists in British politics. The Global Warming Policy Foundation is a prominent lobbying think tank founded by Conservative MP Nigel Lawson. Some members of the UK Independence Party have been characterised as deniers and have dismissed climate change risks and the party has opposed climate policies, with some claims within its 2013 energy policy document found to be based on documents from the Global Warming Policy Foundation. The Global Warming Policy Foundation and some members of the Conservative Party shifted to opposing the perceived cost of net zero rather than outright denying the occurrence of climate change in the 2020s.

Activism and cultural responses

Environmental direct action has occurred in the UK. Camps for Climate Action began in 2006 with the Drax Power Station, until their disbandment in 2011. School strikes took place from the 2010s, and groups such as Extinction Rebellion and Insulate Britain using tactics such as traffic obstruction in protest of climate change issues. Extinction Rebellion was founded by a group of UK activists in 2018, subsequently expanding to other countries and influencing the global climate movement.

In February 2014 during major flooding the Church of England said that it will pull its investments from companies that fail to do enough to fight the "great demon" of climate change and ignore the church's theological, moral and social priorities. In 2007, a London Live Earth concert took place to raise awareness of climate change and in 2019, numerous musicians, record labels and venues in the British music industry formed environmental pressure group Music Declares Emergency to demand mitigation.

Media coverage 

British tabloid newspaper reporting on climate change between 2000 and 2006 significantly diverged from the scientific consensus that climate change is driven by human activity. The political leaning of newspapers influenced their likelihood of covering climate change, with the left-leaning The Guardian paper covering the issue more than the more conservative Times, Daily Telegraph and Daily Mail between 1997 and 2017. The BBC has faced criticism for inviting fringe views into coverage of climate change, and in 2018 admitted that it had covered climate change "wrong too often" and that it was false balance to invite deniers into its coverage. Media coverage of the July 2022 heat wave corresponded to different political viewpoints, particularly whether climate change was mentioned or the severity of the heat wave was downplayed.

Monarchy 

The British royal family have advocated for climate change mitigation. Charles III has expressed concern over the impacts of climate change and called for action on the issue among world leaders, including advocating for a "Marshall-like plan" to address it. Elizabeth II called for action on climate change at COP26. Prince William and Prince Harry also adopted climate change causes, with The Royal Foundation funding the Earthshot Prize under William's patronage. Environmentalists have recognised their role in the cause, but have been critical of the ecological condition of the Crown Estate.

By region

London 
 London is particularly vulnerable to climate change, with concern among hydrological experts that households in the city may run out of water before 2050.

Scotland

Wales

See also

4 Degrees and Beyond International Climate Conference, a 2009 conference held in Oxford
A Green New Deal
Climate change in Europe
Climate change in Ireland
Committee on Climate Change
Environmental effects of aviation in the United Kingdom
Environmental inequality in the United Kingdom
Environmental issues in the United Kingdom
London Climate Change Agency

References

External links

 Climate change in the UK at the Met Office website
 UK Climate Change Committee
 United Kingdom Summary | World Bank Climate Change Knowledge Portal
 What will climate change look like near me? at BBC News
 Climate change insights at the Office for National Statistics

Adapting to climate change at the UK government website

 
United Kingdom